A chuba is a long sheepskin coat made of thick Tibetan wool worn by many of the nomadic peoples of high altitude in the cold mountains of Tibet.

The traditional sherpa clothing is distinctive to solu-khumba, the basic garment of the sherpas; the chuba originated in the cold climate of Tibet. A chuba is a warm ankle-length robe that is bound around the waist by a long sash. Its upper portion becomes a large pocket for everything from money to bowls.

In the past, chubas were made from strips of hand-woven woollen cloth; they were originally the un-dyed white colour of the sheep's wool from Tibet. More recently, black or brown dyes have been used. On trading trips to Tibet, people often wore sheep skin chubas, jackets or pants.

See also
 Tibetan clothing
 Bakhu
 Chab chab
 Kira (Bhutan)

References

Tibetan clothing
History of Asian clothing